Steve Steadham (born in February, 1963, in Farmington, NM) is a regular-footed American skateboarding pioneer, former Bones Brigade member, and musician.

Early life 
Steadham grew up in Las Vegas and California, going to high school in Las Vegas. He started seriously skateboarding when he was 17. In 1981, Steadham moved to California.

Skateboarding 
Steadham worked in the Whittier skatepark's pro shop where Lance Mountain was his co-worker. Neil Blender, Lester Kasai, and John Lucero were also locals at the park. Steadham helped popularize the boneless.

Within two years of moving to California, Steadham signed to Powell & Peralta. Steadham turned pro in 1984 for Powell. After riding for Powell for over a year, Steadham left Powell and started his own company: Steadham Skateboards.

Stedmz Skateboard 
Steadham Skateboards evolved in to Stedmz Skateboards.

Music 
Steadham is in three bands: Citizen X, Funkenstein and Freight Train.

References

American skateboarders
Living people
African-American skateboarders
People from Farmington, New Mexico
1963 births
African-American businesspeople
21st-century African-American people
20th-century African-American sportspeople